Reinga Bloxham, also known as Reinga Te Huia, is a former New Zealand netball player and current coach. During the Coca-Cola Cup/National Bank Cup era, she played for Southern Sting. Since 2016, she has served as head coach of Southern Steel in the ANZ Premiership. In 2017 and 2018, Bloxham guided Steel to two successive ANZ Premiership titles.

Early life and family
Bloxham is a Māori with Ngāti Kahungunu affiliations. She was born and raised in Southland. Differing sources give her place of birth as either Gore or Wyndham. She is a niece of Georgie Salter, the former New Zealand netball international. Bloxham is the mother of two children, a son, Te Kaanu (born, c. 2000) and a daughter, Maraea (born, c. 2005). Bloxham is also a primary school teacher.

Playing career

Southern Sting
Between 1998 and 2004, during the Coca-Cola Cup/National Bank Cup era, Bloxham played as a midcourter for Southern Sting. She was a founding member of the Southern Sting team.

Southland
Bloxham also played representative netball for Southland in the National Championships.

Coaching career

Southland
In 2009, Te Huia, together with Jo Cunningham, co-coached the Southland team to victory in the Lois Muir Challenge. In 2010 and 2011, Te Huia and Cunningham co-coached the Southland team in the National Provincial Championships. Te Huia was the sole head coach of the Southland NPC team in both 2012 and 2013.

Netball South
In 2014 Te Huia was head coach of the Netball South U23 team that finished as runners up in the National U23 Championships.

Southern Steel
Assistant coach
During the 2013 ANZ Championship season, Te Huia joined Southern Steel as a defensive coach, replacing Natalie Avellino as a member of Steel's coaching staff. In 2014 and 2015, she served as assistant coach to Janine Southby. When Southby was appointed New Zealand head coach, Te Huia unsuccessfully applied for the Steel head coach position. Despite this, she subsequently served Noeline Taurua as assistant coach for the 2016 season and helped Steel finish as minor premiers.

Head coach
In October 2016, ahead of the 2017 season, Southern Steel appointed Te Huia, now Bloxham, as their new head coach. She subsequently guided Steel to an unbeaten season with 21 wins and zero defeats. Steel finished the season as minor premiers and winners of both the 2017 ANZ Premiership and the 2017 Netball New Zealand Super Club. In 2018, Bloxham guided Steel to a second ANZ Premiership title.

New Zealand
In 2022, Bloxham has worked with New Zealand as head coach of the New Zealand A team and as assistant coach of the senior team.

Honours

Coach
Southern Steel
ANZ Premiership
Winners: 2017, 2018
Minor premiers: 2017
Netball New Zealand Super Club
Winners: 2017

Player
Southern Sting
Coca-Cola Cup/National Bank Cup
Winners: 1999, 2001, 2002, 2003, 2004

References 

Living people
Year of birth missing (living people)
New Zealand Māori netball players
New Zealand netball players
New Zealand netball coaches
ANZ Premiership coaches
Southern Steel coaches
Southern Sting players
Sportspeople from Southland, New Zealand
New Zealand schoolteachers
New Zealand Māori schoolteachers
Ngāti Kahungunu people